The Democratic Party of Austria (DPÖ), was a short-lived political party in Austria between 1945 and 1949.

History
The Democratic Party of Austria was founded on 14 July 1945 as a liberal party focused on regional development of Carinthia. 

Although the party had a liberal program, the party is made up of liberals, monarchistic Habsburg Roylists and National Socialists. This ideological clash is one of the main reasons for the failure of the party.

In 1946, several members were arrested because they were members of the NSDAP and the SS. The party then tries to get rid of the Nazi wing, but this remains in place until the end of the party.

In the 1949 Austrian legislative election, the leadership of the party endorsed Austrian People's Party and subsequently dissolved.

The National Socialists switch to the FPÖ or are no longer politically active. The Liberals switch to SPÖ and monarchistic Roylists switch ÖVP.

References

Defunct political parties in Austria
Defunct liberal political parties in Austria
Political history of Austria
Liberal parties
Conservative parties in Austria
1945 establishments in Austria
1949 disestablishments in Austria
Political parties established in 1945
Political parties disestablished in 1949